Maureen Phillips is a former Trinidadian cricketer who represented the Trinidad and Tobago women's national cricket team.

A bowler, Phillips played in two women's One Day Internationals at the inaugural Women's Cricket World Cup in 1973 in England. Playing in matches against New Zealand and the International XI she finished the tournament with just one wicket – that of New Zealand middle order batsman Shirley Cowles, out leg before wicket for six runs.

References

 

Living people
Trinidad and Tobago women cricketers
Year of birth missing (living people)
Place of birth missing (living people)